St. Francis de Sales Catholic Church is a parish of the Roman Catholic Church in Norton Shores, Michigan, USA. With a membership of about 1,300 households, it is the largest parish in the surrounding Muskegon area. The parish's current building, noted for its hyperbolic paraboloid form and brutalist design, was designed by modernist architect Marcel Breuer and his associate Herbert Beckhard in 1964.

History 
St. Francis de Sales parish was founded in 1948. The church originally met in Ruddiman Terrace, a WWII-era federally constructed building. Two years later, the church moved to its first full building; the structure sat on McCracken Street, across the street from the current church. The church's new building quickly proved inadequate for the parish's growing membership and by 1958 plans for another structure were underway.

St. Francis de Sales commissioned modernist architect Marcel Breuer to design the structure in 1961; construction on the building began three years later in 1964. Given the structure's unconventional forms, contractors known for expertise in poured concrete were specifically selected for the project.

The first Mass in the new church was celebrated in December 1966 following the completion of the structure.

In 1989 the parish executed a round of renovations that included the addition of south and main entrances and construction of Shepherds Hall, a social center.

In 2011, former Rev. Philip Salmonowicz began a plan to renovate and expand the building; work began in 2016 and ended in 2018. The $2.5 million project included a number of adjustments to the original structure, including a plan to renovate the church's main entrance for increased accessibility and visibility.

Gallery

Works cited 

Buildings and structures in Muskegon County, Michigan
Roman Catholic churches in Michigan
Marcel Breuer buildings
Brutalist architecture in Michigan
Churches in Muskegon County, Michigan
Churches completed in 1966
Christian organizations established in 1948